Kommissar X – Drei gelbe Katzen is a 1966 Eurospy film written and co-directed by Rudolf Zehetgruber and Gianfranco Parolini.  Filmed in Ceylon, it stars Tony Kendall,  Brad Harris and Dan Vadis with Harris and Vadis doing their own stuntwork. It is the second of seven films, loosely based on the 1961 Kommissar X #73 detective novel from the Pabel Moewig publishing house, though the original novel was set in Burma.

Plot
Tom Rowland from the New York Police Department is sent to Colombo to investigate the murder of a US embassy official killed protecting the daughter of a wealthy expatriate American landowner. At the same time New York Private Investigator Joe Walker has been hired by the landowner's daughter to protect her father from being extorted for one million dollars. Through the Ceylon Police they discover a terrorist organisation known as the Three Golden Cats are responsible for both activities and a string of murders with the victims killed by karate blows or by biological chemicals.

Cast 

 Tony Kendall ... Joe Louis Walker, aka Kommissar X 
 Brad Harris ...  Captain Tom Rowland
Ann Smyrner ... Babs Lincoln
Michèle Mahaut... Michèle 
Dan Vadis 	... King
Siegfried Rauch 	... Nitro
H.D. Kulatunga 	... Sunny
Philippe Lemaire ... Philip Dawson
Erno Crisa 	... Baker
Rudolf Zehetgruber (as Rolf Zehett) ... 	Barrett 
A. Jayaratii 	... Insp. DaSilva 
Theo Maria Werner (as Werner Hauff) ... Geldbote 
Paul Beckmann 	... 	Rogers 
Chandrika 'Champa' Liyanage ... Photographer

Release
Kommissar X – Drei gelbe Katzen was released in Austria on 17 May 1966.

References

External links

1966 films
1960s spy action films
1960s buddy films
German spy action films
Italian spy action films
Italian buddy films
West German films
1960s Italian-language films
1960s German-language films
Films directed by Rudolf Zehetgruber
Films directed by Gianfranco Parolini
Films shot in Sri Lanka
Martial arts films
Films set in Sri Lanka
Films based on German novels
1960s spy thriller films
1960s multilingual films
German multilingual films
Italian multilingual films
Austrian multilingual films
1960s Italian films
1960s German films